Maria Landes-Hindemith, née Maria Landes, (13 March 1901 – 1987) was a German pianist and music educator.

Life 
Born in Munich the daughter of an engineer, Landes was taught to play the piano early on by Anna Hirzel-Langenhan, Hermann Zilcher and Walter Lampe. Rudolf Hindemith, later her husband, also worked with her to perfect her playing. She celebrated successes at home and abroad, but ultimately remained as an assistant and then professor at the Hochschule für Musik und Theater München, where Lampe also taught previously. There she tailored her teaching to the individual needs of the students and was considered a master of music education.

Publications 
 Kompendium der Klaviertechnik. Robert Lienau Musikverlag, Berlin, 1993 (postum).

Further reading 
 Antonius Lux (ed.): Große Frauen der Weltgeschichte. Tausend Biographien in Wort und Bild. Sebastian Lux Verlag, Munich 1963, .

References

External links 
 

1901 births
1987 deaths
German classical pianists
Women classical pianists
German music educators
Academic staff of the University of Music and Performing Arts Munich
Musicians from Munich